Bonginkosi Macala (born 5 October 1985 in Kroonstad) is a South African football (soccer) player who last played as a defender and midfielder for AmaZulu in the Premier Soccer League.

He spent time in the United States playing for the University of Connecticut.

References

1985 births
Living people
People from Kroonstad
South African soccer players
Association football defenders
Association football midfielders
Santos F.C. (South Africa) players
Association football utility players
Jomo Cosmos F.C. players
UConn Huskies men's soccer players
University of Pretoria F.C. players
AmaZulu F.C. players
South African expatriate soccer players
Expatriate soccer players in the United States
South African expatriate sportspeople in the United States